This was the first edition of the tournament.

Christopher Eubanks and Roberto Quiroz won the title after defeating Jesper de Jong and Sem Verbeek 6–4, 6–3 in the final.

Seeds

Draw

References

External links
 Main draw

Saint Petersburg Challenger - Doubles